The Incline is an online newspaper focused on the Pittsburgh, Pennsylvania region. Launched in 2016, the news outlet curates syndicated content and produces original stories aimed towards millennials. Instead of ads, The Incline's revenue comes from events. The best known of which is their "Who's next" event series. In March 2019, The Incline was acquired by WhereBy.Us.

History
Spirited Media founded Philadelphia's web-only local news site Billy Penn in 2014. Billy Penn functions as a mixture of links to news articles produced by other outlets with its own original reporting mixed in. Rather than direct ad sales, Billy Penn found success with an event-based business model. Spirited Media looked for new cities to deploy it in. In 2016, Pittsburgh was identified as the second city after major investments came from Gannett. The Incline deviated from Billy Penn, by selling ads upon its introduction in order to gain exposure and awareness.

The Incline was launched in September 2016. The news outlet was named after the Duquesne Incline. Because of the presence of Silicon Valley companies working with Carnegie Mellon University and the absence of a tech business website in Pittsburgh, the Incline focused more on technology news compared to its Philadelphia counterpart. The Incline was also experimented on curation of news based on the moods of their readers.

Awards and recognition
The Incline won the award for the “Biggest blockbuster story” at the Hearken's 2018 Champions of Curiosity Awards. The Incline obtained recognition in multiple categories from the Press Club of Western Pennsylvania at the 54th Golden Quill Awards. The Incline won an award from the 30th Anniversary Vann Media Awards for their coverage of business news.

References

External links

American news websites
Newspapers published in Pittsburgh
Internet properties established in 2016